Thomas William Ewing (born September 19, 1935 in Atlanta, Illinois) is a former Republican member of the United States House of Representatives and the Illinois State House of Representatives. Ewing was a state representative from 1974 to 1991, and a U.S. Congressman representing the 15th district of Illinois from July 2, 1991 until his retirement on January 3, 2001. In January 1995 he was named a Deputy Republican House Whip. While a U.S. Congressman, Thomas Ewing was considered to be a Conservative, favoring a smaller, less intrusive government, but more on economic issues than on social ones.

Early life, education, and career
Ewing has a B.S. from Millikin University, Decatur, Illinois, where he was a member of the Illinois Delta chapter of Sigma Alpha Epsilon, and a J.D. from John Marshall Law School in Chicago. Ewing served in the United States Army Reserve from 1957 to 1963. He practiced law privately from 1968 until 1991, and Ewing was the Livingston County, Illinois Assistant State's Attorney from 1968 until 1973. He earned his seat in Congress after a special election was called following the resignation of Edward Madigan.

Tenure
During his tenure in the Illinois General Assembly he served as a member of the Agriculture Committee and as chairman of the House Revenue Committee.  He was considered an expert on revenue and fiscal matters.  In Congress Ewing served on the House Committee on Agriculture, Transportation and Infrastructure, Science, and House Administration.  He chaired the Agriculture Subcommittee on Risk Management and Specialty Crops.  A leader in the Congressional Rural Caucus, Ewing used his Agriculture Subcommittee chairmanship to call attention to the concerns of the nation's farmers.  He was elevated to Deputy Whip in the GOP party structure. He also served on the Central Committee for the Illinois Republican Party.

Ewing took an active part in the Republican Revolution that brought his party to the majority in the House of Representatives for the first time in more than 40 years.  He was selected by Newt Gingrich to take his chairmanship of the Conservative Opportunity Society when he was elected House Speaker in 1995.  A strong supporter of the Contract for America, he championed those efforts to achieve a balanced budget.  Ewing was instrumental in rallying the support to elect Dennis Hastert Speaker of the House in 1998.  In December 2000 he introduced the Commodity Futures Modernization Act of 2000.

After Congress
From 2001 to 2007, Ewing served as the chairman of the Biomass Research and Development Technical Advisory Committee, a joint effort of the Department of Agriculture and Department of Energy to encourage renewable fuel development and production.  The position was a non-paying appointment.  He is a former director of the Energy Future Coalition and the Future Commodity Trading Commission, a regulatory body over America's future exchanges.  He is also a former director of the Institute for Representative Government, a federally-funded bipartisan effort to advance democratic principles among the leaders of developing nations.

He served 12 years as Chairman of Monsanto's National Grower Advisory Council, a distinguished group made up of the elected chairmen and CEOs of the most major agricultural commodities and connected trade promotion groups in America.

He has received honorary Doctor of Law degrees from Lincoln College, The John Marshall Law School, and Millikin University.  In 2002 he was honored by being selected by the Millikin Board of Trustees as a recipient of the Millikin Medallion Society award, the Illinois Farm Bureau Charles B. Shuman Distinguished Service Award, and inducted into the Hall of Fame of the 67th Sigma Alpha Epsilon Leadership School.

In 2005 and 2006 he completed two task force assignments: first, with the Chicago Council on Foreign Relations to examine the future of U.S. agriculture policy, and second, as co-chairman of the Aspen Institute's three-day symposium on achieving the security, environmental, and economic potential of bioenergy.

He is a former director of the Energy Future Coalition and the Future Commodity Trading Commission, a regulatory body over America's future exchanges.  He is also a former director of the Institute for Representative Government, a federally-funded bipartisan effort to advance democratic principles among the leaders of developing nations.  He is a retired director of the Pontiac National Bank Holding Company.

He is working on several major initiatives to advance the development of alternate and renewable energy sources that would benefit our national economy, contribute to national defense, and reduce our need for imported oil, and was a member of the Steering Committee of the Ag Energy Working Group 25x25.  He also serves as a member of the Advisory Board of the International Conservation Caucus Foundation, is active with Fix the Debt, a campaign of the Committee for a Responsible Federal Budget, and serves as Senior Policy Advisor to the Washington law firm Davis & Harman LLP.

Private life
Congressman Ewing and his wife Connie are the parents of six adult children.

References

External links 

 

1935 births
Living people
People from Livingston County, Illinois
People from Atlanta, Illinois
Republican Party members of the Illinois House of Representatives
Illinois lawyers
District attorneys in Illinois
American prosecutors
Military personnel from Illinois
United States Army soldiers
Republican Party members of the United States House of Representatives from Illinois
John Marshall Law School (Chicago) alumni
Members of Congress who became lobbyists